Margaret Osborne duPont (born Margaret Evelyn Osborne; March 4, 1918 – October 24, 2012) was a world No. 1 American female tennis player.

DuPont won a total of 37 singles, women's doubles, and mixed doubles Grand Slam titles, which places her fourth on the all-time list, despite never entering the Australian Championships. She won 25 of her Grand Slam titles at the U.S. Championships, which is an all-time record.

Career
DuPont won six Grand Slam singles titles. She saved match points in the final of the 1946 French International Championships (versus Pauline Betz) and in the final of the 1948 U.S. National Championships (versus Louise Brough). The 48 games played during the 1948 final remain the most played in a women's singles final at that tournament.

DuPont teamed with Brough to win 20 Grand Slam women's doubles titles, tied with Martina Navratilova and Pam Shriver for the most Grand Slam titles ever won by a women's doubles team. DuPont and Brough won nine consecutive titles at the U.S. National Championships from 1942 through 1950. They won that tournament in 12 of the 14 years they entered as a team. Their 12 titles is an all-time record for a women's doubles team at the U.S. National Championships, well-surpassing the four career titles won by the teams of Navratilova and Shriver, Doris Hart and Shirley Fry, and Sarah Palfrey Cooke and Alice Marble. DuPont won 13 women's doubles titles, 10 of which were in succession from 1941 through 1950, at the U.S. National Championships. Both of those are all-time records.

DuPont's nine mixed doubles titles at the U.S. National Championships is more than any other player. Four of those titles were in partnership with William Talbert, which is a record for a mixed doubles team at the U.S. National Championships. One each with Ken McGregor and Ken Rosewall, and three were with Neale Fraser.

According to John Olliff and Lance Tingay of The Daily Telegraph and the Daily Mail, duPont was ranked in the world top 10 from 1946 through 1950, and in 1953-1954, and in 1956-1957. She was ranked world No. 1 from 1947 through 1950. No rankings were issued from 1940 through 1945.

DuPont was included in the year-end top 10 rankings issued by the United States Lawn Tennis Association in 1938, from 1941 through 1950, and in 1953, 1956 and 1958. She was the top ranked U.S. player from 1948 through 1950.

From 1938 through 1958, DuPont went undefeated in 10 Wightman Cup competitions, winning 10 singles and nine doubles matches. She also was the captain of the U.S. team nine times, and won eight.

Personal life
Margaret married William duPont, Jr. on November 26, 1947 and later interrupted her career to give birth to a son, William duPont III on July 22, 1952. She is one of the few women to win a major title after childbirth. DuPont never played the Australian Championships because her husband would not let her.
 

She later divorced duPont in 1964 and formed a life partnership with fellow player Margaret Varner Bloss.

DuPont died on October 24, 2012 while in hospice care in El Paso, Texas at age 94.

Awards
She was inducted into the International Tennis Hall of Fame in 1967. The Delaware Sports Museum and Hall of Fame inducted DuPont in 1999. In 2010, she was inducted into the US Open Court of Champions.

Grand Slam finals

Singles (6 titles, 4 runners-up)

Doubles (21 titles, 6 runners-up)

Mixed doubles: (10 titles, 4 runners-up)

Grand Slam performance timelines

Singles

Women's doubles

Mixed doubles

R = tournament restricted to French nationals and held under German occupation.
1In 1946 and 1947, the French Championships were held after Wimbledon.

See also
 Performance timelines for all female tennis players who reached at least one Grand Slam final

References

External links
 

American female tennis players
Margaret Osborne
French Championships (tennis) champions
People from Wallowa County, Oregon
Tennis people from Delaware
International Tennis Hall of Fame inductees
Tennis people from Oregon
United States National champions (tennis)
Wimbledon champions (pre-Open Era)
1918 births
2012 deaths
Grand Slam (tennis) champions in women's singles
Grand Slam (tennis) champions in women's doubles
Grand Slam (tennis) champions in mixed doubles
World number 1 ranked female tennis players